Baranowskiella is a genus of beetles in the Ptiliidae family.

References 

Ptiliidae
Staphyliniformia genera